Raton is an active railroad station in the city of Raton, Colfax County, New Mexico, United States. Located at 201 South First Street, the station serves Amtrak's Southwest Chief. Connections are also available to Denver, Colorado via Amtrak Thruway Motorcoach bus service. The station is staffed during the summer season when tourism for the Philmont Scout Ranch and the National Rifle Association (NRA) Whittington Center is at its peak.  During off-seasons, it is open at all train times, maintained by a caretaker.  Passengers with layovers there often visit the non-profit Old Pass Gallery, located on the station grounds in the restored 1910 Railway Express Agency building. The station also includes a former freight depot.

Railroad service through the community of Otero, New Mexico Territory began on July 4, 1879, when service opened to Las Vegas on the Atchison, Topeka and Santa Fe Railroad. The railroad began construction of a new station in May 1903. Designed in a Mission Revival architectural style, the new depot opened on January 4, 1904.

See also 
List of Amtrak stations

Bibliography

References

Further reading

External links

 Raton Amtrak Station – USA RailGuide (TrainWeb)

Amtrak stations in New Mexico
Atchison, Topeka and Santa Fe Railway stations in New Mexico
Buildings and structures in Colfax County, New Mexico
Mission Revival architecture in New Mexico
Transportation in Colfax County, New Mexico
Railway stations in the United States opened in 1879
Raton, New Mexico
1879 establishments in New Mexico Territory